The 2000 Swedish Rally (formally the 49th International Swedish Rally) was the second round of the 2000 World Rally Championship. The race was held over three days between 11 February and 13 February 2000, and was won by Peugeot's Marcus Grönholm, his 1st win in the World Rally Championship.

Background

Entry list

Itinerary
All dates and times are CET (UTC+1).

Results

Overall

World Rally Cars

Classification

Special stages

Championship standings

FIA Cup for Production Rally Drivers

Classification

Special stages

Championship standings

References

External links 
 Official website of the World Rally Championship

Sweden
Swedish Rally
Rally